Ur-gigir (ur-{gesh}gigir) was the son of Ur-nigin and a Governor (ensi) of Uruk who lived in 22nd century BCE.

According to the Sumerian King List, Ur-gigir's father Ur-nigin destroyed the Akkadian Empire, which had probably already be weakened by the Gutians, and established a short-lived Fifth Dynasty of Uruk. 

The Sumerian King List, describing the confusion of the decline of the Akkadian Empire after the death of Shar-kali-shari, mentions the rule of several kings, among them Ur-gigir:

Ur-gigir appears in several of his own votive inscriptions, where he mentions his father Ur-nigin. One of them reads:

The Fourth Dynasty of Uruk was finally destroyed by the Gutian Dynasty.

See also

History of Sumer
Sumerian king list

References

|-

22nd-century BC Sumerian kings
Kings of Uruk
Sumerian kings